Cantù-Cermenate railway station is a railway station in Italy. Located on the Milan–Chiasso railway, it serves the towns of Cantù and Cermenate.

Services
Cantù-Cermenate is served by the line S11 of Milan suburban railway service, operated by the lombard railway company Trenord.

See also
Milan suburban railway service

References

External links

Railway stations in Lombardy
Milan S Lines stations